Sand Pillow is a census-designated place (CDP) in Jackson County, Wisconsin, United States. As of the 2020 census, it had a population of 262.

The community is in central Jackson County, on land of the Ho-Chunk Nation of Wisconsin. It is bordered to the south by Wisconsin Highway 54, which leads southwest  to Black River Falls, the county seat, and east  to Port River.

References 

Populated places in Jackson County, Wisconsin
Census-designated places in Jackson County, Wisconsin
Census-designated places in Wisconsin
Ho-Chunk Nation of Wisconsin